Francisco "Fran" Javier Delgado Rojano (born 11 July 2001) is a Spanish professional footballer who plays as a right back for Betis Deportivo Balompié.

Club career
Born in Écija, Seville, Andalusia, Delgado joined Real Madrid's La Fábrica in 2011, from hometown club Écija Balompié. He left the club in July 2017, and subsequently signed a three-year deal with Real Betis. 

Delgado made his senior debut with the reserves on 19 December 2018, coming on as a late substitute in a 3–1 Tercera División away win against Conil CF. On 10 October 2020, he renewed his contract until 2024.

Delgado made his first team debut on 6 January 2021, replacing Emerson Royal late into a 1–3 away win against UD Mutilvera, for the season's Copa del Rey. His professional debut occurred eleven days later, as he again replaced Emerson in a 2–0 win at Sporting de Gijón, also for the national cup.

References

External links
 Real Madrid profile 
 
 

2001 births
Living people
People from Écija
Sportspeople from the Province of Seville
Spanish footballers
Footballers from Andalusia
Association football defenders
Primera Federación players
Segunda División B players
Tercera División players
Betis Deportivo Balompié footballers
Real Betis players